Joe Lancaster may refer to:

Joe Lancaster (footballer) (born 1926), retired footballer who played for Manchester United and Accrington Stanley
Joe Lancaster (football trainer) (1926–2015), football trainer and sports journalist who covered such events as the Olympic Games
Joe Lancaster (musician) (born 1990), metalcore and jazz band member

See also
Joseph Lancaster (1778–1838), English Quaker and public education innovator
Joseph B. Lancaster (1790–1856), American lawyer and politician